"Supernatural Love" is the second single from Donna Summer's 1984 Cats Without Claws album. The song released on October 23, 1984 by Geffen Records (US) and Warner Bros. Records (UK). It was written by Summer, Michael Omartian and Bruce Sudano, and produced by Omartian. The typically 1980s synthesized song was remixed for its release as a single and became a minor hit in the US. It was accompanied by a very colourful video again featuring Donna and husband Bruce Sudano as a star-crossed couple chasing each other through time when he is abducted by an evil enchantress—from the stone age into current 1980s New Wave, where Donna pursues the enchantress in order to save him.

While the single only peaked at #75 on Billboard's Hot 100 chart, it fared better on the Billboard Hot Dance Club Play chart at #39.

Track listing
US 7"
 "Supernatural Love (Remix)" – 3:38
 "Face the Music" – 4:14

European 7"
 "Supernatural Love (Remix)" – 3:38
 "Suzanna" – 4:29

US 12"
 "Supernatural Love (Extended Dance Remix)" – 6:12 (Remixed by Juergen Koppers)
 "Face the Music" – 4:14

European 12"
 "Supernatural Love (UK Extended Dance Remix)" – 6:12 (Remixed by Juergen Koppers / UK Remix is slightly different)
 "Suzanna" – 4:29

Chart positions

References

Donna Summer songs
1984 singles
Songs written by Donna Summer
Songs written by Michael Omartian
Songs written by Bruce Sudano
Song recordings produced by Michael Omartian
1984 songs
Geffen Records singles
Warner Records singles
Post-disco songs
Dance-rock songs